Harvey Wallis Salmon (January 26, 1839 – April 27, 1927) was a U.S. politician from Missouri.

Biography
He was born in Greenville County, South Carolina. As a child, he re-settled in Morgan County, Missouri. At the age of 13, he was employed as a store clerk in Versailles, Missouri. In 1859, he entered into a partnership with his brother to establish a general store. During the first year of the American Civil War, he served in the Missouri State Guard. He returned to Morgan County, serving as a Confederate Army recruiter when he was captured by Union forces and held for ten months. Upon his release from captivity, he re-joined the Confederate Army, serving on the general staff. Following the war, he moved to Clinton, Missouri, where he engaged in the banking and real estate industries. From 1873 to 1875, he served as State Treasurer of Missouri. He was buried in Englewood Cemetery in Clinton, Missouri.

Notes

References
Missouri State Treasurer Scott Fitzpatrick-Past Treasurer's Biography

1839 births
1927 deaths
State treasurers of Missouri
Missouri Democrats
Confederate States Army officers
People of Missouri in the American Civil War
People from Greenville County, South Carolina
People from Versailles, Missouri
People from Clinton, Missouri